Prairie Roundup is a 1951 American Western film directed by Fred F. Sears and starring Charles Starrett, Mary Castle and Frank Fenton. It is part of the Durango Kid series.

Main cast
 Charles Starrett as Steve Carson / The Durango Kid 
 Mary Castle as Toni Eaton 
 Frank Fenton as Buck Prescott 
 The Sunshine Boys as Singing Cowhands 
 Smiley Burnette as Smiley Burnette 
 Lane Chandler as Red Dawson

References

Bibliography
 Blottner, Gene. Columbia Pictures Movie Series, 1926-1955: The Harry Cohn Years. McFarland, 2011.

External links
 

1951 films
1951 Western (genre) films
American Western (genre) films
Films directed by Fred F. Sears
Columbia Pictures films
American black-and-white films
1950s English-language films
1950s American films